The 1989 South American Cross Country Championships took place on February 26, 1989.  The races were held in Asunción, Paraguay.

Complete results, results for junior and youth competitions, and medal winners were published.

Medallists

Race results

Senior men's race (12 km)

Junior (U20) men's race (8 km)

Senior women's race (8 km)

Junior (U20) women's race (6 km)

Medal table (unofficial)

Participation
According to an unofficial count, 32 athletes from 6 countries participated.

 (12)
 (1)
 (6)
 (2)
 (10)
 (1)

See also
 1989 in athletics (track and field)

References

External links
 GBRathletics

South American Cross Country Championships
South American Cross Country Championships
South American Cross Country Championships
International athletics competitions hosted by Paraguay
Cross country running in Paraguay
International sports competitions in Asunción
February 1989 sports events in South America
1980s in Asunción